Safa Public School is a school in Nalgonda, Telangana, India offering both standard and Islamic education, established in June 2001.

See also
Education in India
List of schools in India
List of institutions of higher education in Telangana

References

External links 
Official Website

2001 establishments in Andhra Pradesh
Educational institutions established in 2001
Nalgonda district
High schools and secondary schools in Telangana